This page shows the results of the triathlon competition at the 1999 Pan American Games in Winnipeg, Manitoba, Canada. The men's and the women's race were both held on Saturday July 24, 1999.

Men's competition

Women's competition

Medal table

References
Results
UOL results

P
1999
Events at the 1999 Pan American Games